Hedong is a town in  Liangzhou District, Wuwei, Gansu, People's Republic of China, located  southeast of downtown Wuwei. , it has one residential community and 12 villages under its administration.

See also 
 List of township-level divisions of Gansu

References 

Township-level divisions of Gansu
Wuwei, Gansu